The Euro Hockey League 2015–16 is the ninth season of the Euro Hockey League, Europe's premier club field hockey tournament. Round One was held in Hamburg, the round of 16 and quarterfinals in Amstelveen and the Final four in Barcelona.

The final was played between Amsterdam and Kampong at the Pau Negre Stadium in Barcelona. Kampong beat Amsterdam 2–0 and won their first Euro Hockey League title.

Round one
Round one was held from 9 until 11 October 2015 in Hamburg, Germany.

Pool A

Pool B

Pool C

Pool D

Knockout stage
The round of 16 and the quarter-finals were played in Amstelveen, Netherlands between 25 and 28 March 2016. The semi-finals, third place match and the final were played in Barcelona, Spain on 14 and 15 May 2016.

Round of 16

Quarter-finals

Semi-finals

Third place

Final

Statistics

Goalscorers

See also
2016 EuroHockey Club Champions Cup (women)

References

External links 
 Official Website (English)
 European Hockey Federation

Euro Hockey League
2015–16 in European field hockey